The Club Inglés Bella Vista is a cultural institution that exists in the Spanish municipality of Minas de Ríotinto, in the province of Huelva. It was founded in 1878 by members of the British colony of Minas de Riotinto who worked for the Rio Tinto Company Limited (RTCL), and it soon become the center of social life in that British colony. Together with Exiles Cable Club (1873) in Vigo, this was one of the very first companies dedicated to sports in the country, most notably, cricket, tennis and football, having sections dedicated to the said sports due to its prominence in England, the homeland of the company's workers.

Background
The copper mines of Rio Tinto had been exploited since the ancient times, but during the second half of the 19th century, English investors nailed it down, and in 1873, they founded the Rio Tinto Company Limited (RTCL), who soon won a concession to exploit the mines which were previously run by the state, the First Spanish Republic. The Englishmen who worked in the mines did not have much to do in the small town, so they gathered to play their favorite sports, like cricket, rugby, and football. Although the first football games were played in 1873, it was not until 1878 that RTC formed the Club Inglés (English club) to promote culture, sport, and spare time among the workers.

Origins
In 1878, the Rio Tinto Company founded a place intended for entertainment and recreation of the English colony, Club Inglés Bella Vista, which had three sports sections called Cricket Club Río Tinto, Lawn-Tennis Río Tinto and Foot-Ball Club Río Tinto. The company's membership was initially restricted to technicians from the Rio Tinto Company Limited (RTC) who resided in the area.

On 4 December, the new building built and furnished by the Río Tinto Company in order to be the headquarters of its club was inaugurated at Calle Sanz in the old village of Minas de Río Tinto. During its first years of existence, the Río Tinto club encouraged and promoted the practice of sports and cultural activities. The British colony in the area kept growing throughout the 1880s and began to spread its influence to a place distant from the historic town, later known as the Bella Vista neighborhood. These residents would request a place where they could carry out their activities without having to travel to Río Tinto, so in 1884, a wooden pavilion was built in Bella Vista to serve as the seat of the social club.

Massive success
From that moment, Bellavista became the center of social, sports, and recreational activities in the British colony of Río Tinto. Later, in 1903, a brick building would be erected to house the new headquarters. The club came to have several rooms, such as a reading room with British books, newspapers, and magazines, or a room for exclusively male use. Several sports fields would also be built in Bellavista, where cricket, badminton, tennis, football, or polo were practiced. The British community would also practice water sports in the Zumajo reservoir. Social events held at the club ranged from dances and costume parties to celebrations for the coronations of monarchs such as George VI in 1937 and Elizabeth II in 1953. The Club Inglés also came to host celebrations organized by RTC to mark the end of the First Boer War, World War I, and World War II.

Tennis
Tennis began to be practiced for the first time in Spain in Minas de Riotinto and it was one of the sports that took root the most in Huelva because they were among the sports practiced by the local population, and proof of this is the organization of the first Tennis championship, held in 1912.

Football team
A certain William Bice is said to have organized what must have been the first football kick in Spain in 1873. More formalized football games followed the initial ones by August 1874. Railwaymen, dockers and soldiers alike in the Huelva port are also, said to have played football in Río Tinto. The Foot-Ball Club Río Tinto, or Rio Tinto FC, was founded in 1878, and it remained under that name until 1932, when it was refounded as Balompié Rio Tinto and then renamed Rio Tinto Balompie. The first football figures of the club were the likes of Cunningham, Charles Robert Julian, Waterston, Swaby and Geoghegham, employees of the RTCL. There are reports of games between Rio Tinto and Huelva in 1882. In 1886, the Rio Tinto FC was the first in Spain to adhere to the Regulations of the International Football Association Board (IFAB).

Legacy

In 1884, Dr. William Alexander Mackay joined the Club Inglés and created the Sociedad de Juego de Pelota, which organized football games along with other typical British sports. He was soon joined in his work in Huelva by another young doctor, Robert Russell Ross, and the two of them kept organizing football games between the Rio Tinto miners and in 1888, they began to also include crews of English ships who docked in the port of Huelva, ranging from sailors to captains through officers. This entity became known in Huelva as Recreo de Huelva. In the following year, on 18 December 1889, Mackay and Ross, founded the Huelva Recreation Club, a sports club originally intended to provide physical recreation for the Rio Tinto mineworkers in order to improve their health.

References

Defunct football clubs in Andalusia
1878 establishments in Spain
Association football clubs established in 1878
Football clubs in Andalusia
Sport in Huelva
Football in Spain